Justine Tsiranana (c. 1918 – 1 July 1999) was a Malagasy public figure who served as the first First Lady of Madagascar from 1960 to 1972. She was the wife of the country's founding president, Philibert Tsiranana.

Tsiranana was born Justine Kalotody. Originally a seamstress descending from the first translator of the Evangile in Tsimihety language, she married Philibert Tsiranana on January 29, 1933, in a Catholic wedding ceremony in the village of Antsirabe, Mandritsara District. In addition to her role as the country's first First Lady from 1960 to 1972, Tisranana served as the honorary president of the Red Cross of Madagascar.

Justine Tsiranana died in July 1999 at the age of 81.

The award-winning red rose variety “Madame Tsiranana” was created in her honour by French rose nurser Paul Croix in 1970.

Honors
: Order of the Golden Heart Presidential Award (6 August 1964)

References

Date of birth unknown
Date of death unknown
1910s births
1999 deaths
First ladies of Madagascar
Tsimihety people